Yusuf I Jaqeli, also known as Yusuf Pasha, (1594 — 1647) was a Georgian ruler of Childir Eyalet and vassal of the Ottoman Empire from 1635 to 1647, member of the Jaqeli family and the son of Beka III Jaqeli, better known as "Sefer Pasha." . In 1635, after his father's death Ottomans guaranteed Jaqeli family the Meskhetian throne, if they convert to Islam. Yusuf with his family and relatives became Muslim and started ruling Childir. He took appearance in the Ottoman-Safavid war. In 1647 Yusuf I died by unknown illness, leaving the throne to his son, Rostom.

References

Sources
 
 

1594 births
1647 deaths
17th-century people from Georgia (country)
17th-century people from the Ottoman Empire
Converts to Islam from Eastern Orthodoxy
Georgians from the Ottoman Empire
House of Jaqeli
Ottoman governors of Georgia
Pashas
Pashas of Childir Eyalet